The 2023 NPL NSW Men's is the eleventh season of soccer in New South Wales under the banner of the National Premier Leagues and the first season under the revised competition format. The season began on 3 February 2023 and is scheduled to conclude on 27 August.

Sydney Olympic are the defending premiers and Blacktown City are the defending champions.

Promotion and relegation
Teams promoted from the 2022 NSW League One
 Central Coast Mariners Academy
 St George City
 Western Sydney Wanderers Youth
 NWS Spirit FC

Stadiums and locations

Managerial changes

Foreign players

The following do not fill a Visa position:
1Those players who were born and started their professional career abroad but have since gained Australian citizenship
2Australian citizens who have chosen to represent another national team;

Regular Season

Table

Fixtures and results 
The 2023 season sees each team play 30 games, starting on 3 February 2023, and concluding on 27 August 2023.

Regular season statistics

Top scorers

Hat-tricks

Notes
4 Player scored 4 goals
(H) – Home team
(A) – Away team

See also

 2023 National Premier Leagues
 2023 APIA Leichhardt FC season
 2023 Blacktown City FC season
 2023 Manly United FC season
 2023 Marconi Stallions FC season
 2023 Mt Druitt Town Rangers FC season
 2023 North West Sydney Spirit FC season
 2023 Rockdale Ilinden FC season
 2023 Sydney Olympic FC season
 2023 St George City season
 2023 Sydney United 58 FC season
 2023 Sutherland Sharks FC season
 2023 Wollongong Wolves FC season

References 

National Premier Leagues